Flying Lessons is a 2007 Italian drama film directed by Francesca Archibugi.

For her performance Giovanna Mezzogiorno was nominated for Nastro d'Argento for best actress and for David di Donatello in the same category.

Cast 

Giovanna Mezzogiorno: Chiara
Andrea Miglio Risi: Apollonio "Pollo" Sermoneta
Angel Tom Karumathy: "Curry"
Douglas Henshall: Aarto
Angela Finocchiaro: Annalisa
Roberto Citran: Stefano
Anna Galiena: Mother of Pollo
Flavio Bucci: Leone
Archie Panjabi: Sharmila

References

External links

2007 films
Italian drama films
2007 drama films
Films directed by Francesca Archibugi
2000s Italian films